The Prototype Fast Breeder Reactor (PFBR) is a 500 MWe fast breeder nuclear reactor presently being constructed at the Madras Atomic Power Station (MAPS) in Kalpakkam, India. The Indira Gandhi Centre for Atomic Research (IGCAR) is responsible for the design of this reactor. The facility builds on the decades of experience gained from operating the lower power Fast Breeder Test Reactor (FBTR). Originally planned to be commissioned in 2010, the construction of the reactor suffered from multiple delays. As of December 2022, the Prototype Fast Breeder Reactor was expected for completion in 2024.

Background 
The Kalpakkam PFBR is designed to use uranium-238 to breed plutonium in a sodium-cooled fast reactor design. The surplus plutonium (or uranium-233 for thorium reactors) from each fast reactor can be used to set up more such reactors and grow the nuclear capacity in tune with India's needs for power. The PFBR is part of the three-stage nuclear power program.

India has the capability to use thorium cycle based processes to extract nuclear fuel. This is of special significance to the Indian nuclear power generation strategy as India has one of the world's largest reserves of thorium, which could provide power for more than 10,000 years, and perhaps as long as 60,000 years.

History 
The design of this reactor was started in the 1980s, as a prototype for a 600 MW FBR. Construction of the first two FBR are planned at Kalpakkam, after a year of successful operation of the PFBR. Other four FBR are planned to follow beyond 2030, at sites to be defined.

In 2007 the reactor was planned to begin operating in 2010, but as of 2019 it was expected to reach first criticality in 2020. The power island of this project was engineered by Bharat Heavy Electricals Limited (BHEL), largest power equipment utility of India.

In July 2017, it was reported that the reactor is in final preparation to go critical. However in August 2020, it was reported that the reactor might go critical only in December 2021.

As of February 2021, around  have been spent in the construction and commissioning of the reactor. The reactor is now expected to be operational by October 2022.

Technical details 

The reactor is a pool type LMFBR with 1,750 tonnes of sodium as coolant. A fuel burnup of 100 GWd/t is expected. The Advanced Fuel Fabrication Facility (AFFF), under the direction of Bhabha Atomic Research Centre (BARC), Tarapur is responsible for the fuel rods manufacturing. AFFF comes under "Nuclear Recycle Board" of Bhabha Atomic Research Center. AFFF has been responsible for fuel rod manufacturing of various types in the past.

Safety considerations 
The prototype fast breeder reactor has a negative void coefficient, thus ensuring a high level of passive nuclear safety. This means that when the reactor overheats (below the boiling point of sodium) the speed of the fission chain reaction decreases, lowering the power level and the temperature. 
Similarly, before such a potential positive void condition may form from a complete loss of coolant accident, sufficient coolant flow rates are made possible by the use of conventional pump inertia, alongside multiple inlet-perforations, to prevent the possible accident scenario of a single blockage halting coolant flow.

The active-safety reactor decay heat removal system consists of four independent coolant circuits of 8MWt capacity each. Further active defenses against the positive feedback possibility include two independent SCRAM shutdown systems, designed to shut the fission reactions down effectively within a second, with the remaining decay heat then needing to be cooled for a number of hours by the 4 independent circuits. 

The fact that the PFBR is cooled by liquid sodium creates additional safety requirements to isolate the coolant from the environment, especially in a loss of coolant accident scenario, since sodium explodes if it comes into contact with water and burns when in contact with air. This latter event occurred in the Monju reactor in Japan in 1995, although sodium burns only gently in air, and the sodium leak did not release any radioactive elements. Another consideration with the use of sodium as a coolant is the absorption of neutrons to generate the radioactive isotope , which has a 15-hour half life.

See also 
 FBR-600 Commercial variant of the PFBR design
 India's three stage nuclear power programme

References

External links 

The design of the Prototype Fast Breeder Reactor, Nuclear Engineering and Design, April 2006

Liquid metal fast reactors
Nuclear power in India